Crocosmia paniculata is a bulbous flowering plant that is native to eastern South Africa, Lesotho, and Eswatini, growing in wet areas by streams, marshes, and drainages. Plants reach 4 to 5 ft (1.2–1.5 m) tall, with lanceolate leaves and deep orange to orange-brown flowers. It is a popular ornamental plant.

The plant has escape cultivation and become established in the wild in parts of the United Kingdom.

The common name Aunt Eliza is derived from the former generic name Antholyza.

In Lesotho, where it is native, the plant is used by the indigenous Sotho people as an antidiarrhoeal remedy, administered not only to humans, but also to cattle so afflicted.

References

External links
Photos from Bulb Society
Flora of Zimbabwe

Iridaceae
Flora of Southern Africa
Plants described in 1867